These are the results of the women's individual all-around competition, one of six events for female competitors in artistic gymnastics at the 1980 Summer Olympics in Moscow, USSR.  The qualification and final rounds took place on July 21, 23 and 24 at the Sports Palace of the Central Lenin Stadium.

Results

Qualification

Sixty-two gymnasts competed in the compulsory and optional rounds on July 21 and 23.  The thirty-six highest scoring gymnasts advanced to the final on July 24.  Each country was limited to three competitors in the final.  Half of the points earned by each gymnast during both the compulsory and optional rounds carried over to the final.  This constitutes each gymnast's "prelim" score.
(When Nadia Comaneci performed on the beam, her final piece of apparatus, the judges took half an hour to judge her score).

Final

Remaining placings

References

External links
Official Olympic Report
www.gymnasticsresults.com
www.gymn-forum.net

Women's individual all-around
1980 in women's gymnastics
Women's events at the 1980 Summer Olympics